The Archdiocese of Vaduz encompasses the territory of the Principality of Liechtenstein.

History
The Archdiocese of Vaduz was erected by Pope John Paul II in the apostolic constitution Ad satius consulendum on 2 December 1997. Before then it had been the Liechtenstein Deanery, a part of the Swiss Diocese of Chur. The public and solemn ceremony took place on 21 December 1997 in the parish church of Vaduz, which was then raised to the dignity of a cathedral, Vaduz Cathedral.  Wolfgang Haas, who had been a controversial Bishop of Chur since 1988, was appointed to head the new archdiocese formed from part of its territory. Mgr Haas is still the current Archbishop of Vaduz. The Archdiocese of Vaduz does not belong to any conference of bishops and reports directly to the Holy See.

Patrons
The principal patron of the Archdiocese is the Holy Virgin Mary, Mother of God, under the title of her Nativity (September 8). Additional patrons are the martyr St. Lucius (St. Luzi), also a patron of the diocese of Chur, and St. Florin.

Composition
The Archdiocese consists of twelve parishes.

References

External links
  Official website
 Statistics relating to the Archdiocese of Vaduz

Vaduz
Religion in Liechtenstein
Religious organizations based in Liechtenstein
Christian organizations established in 1997